This is a timeline documenting events of Jazz in the year 1966.

Events

January
 14 – The Jazz Crusaders record Live at the Lighthouse '66 at the Lighthouse Café in Hermosa Beach, California (January 14 – 16).

July
 1 – The 13th Newport Jazz Festival started in Newport, Rhode Island (July 1 – 4).

Album releases

Alex Schlippenbach: Globe Unity
Archie Shepp: Mama Too Tight
Bill Evans: Bill Evans at Town Hall
Bobby Hutcherson: Happenings
Bobby Hutcherson: Stick-Up!
Cecil Taylor: Unit Structures
Cecil Taylor: Conquistador!
Charles Lloyd: Dream Weaver
Charles Tyler: Charles Tyler Ensemble
Chick Corea: Tones For Joan's Bones
Denny Zeitlin: Zeitgeist
Dewey Redman: Look for the Black Star
Don Cherry: Symphony For Improvisers
Duke Ellington: The Far East Suite
Guenter Hampel: Assemblage
Hank Mobley: Straight No Filter
Horace Silver: The Jody Grind
Hugh Masekela: Grrr
Hugh Masekela: The Americanization of Ooga Booga
Hugh Masekela: The Emancipation of Hugh Masekela
Jaki Byard: Sunshine of My Soul
Joe Harriott: Indo-Jazz Suite
Joe Harriott: Indo-Jazz Fusions
John Coltrane: Ascension
John Coltrane: Meditations
Joseph Jarman: Song For
Larry Young: Of Love And Peace
Lee Morgan: Delightfulee
Patty Waters: College Tour
Roscoe Mitchell: Sound
Sonny Simmons: Music from the Spheres
Steve Lacy: Sortie
Steve Lacy: The Forest And The Zoo
Sun Ra: Strange Strings
Sunny Murray: Sunny Murray Quintet
Wayne Shorter: Adam's Apple
Wayne Shorter: Speak No Evil

Standards

Deaths

 February
 10 – Osie Johnson, American drummer, arranger, and singer (born 1923).
 23 – Billy Kyle, American pianist (born 1914).

 March
 28 – Kid Howard, American trumpeter (born 1908).

 May
 11 – Isaiah Morgan, American trumpeter (born 1897).
 30 – Thelma Terry, American bandleader and upright bassist (born 1901).

 June
 17 – Johnny St. Cyr, American banjoist and guitarist (born 1890).

 July
 31 – Bud Powell, American pianist (born 1924).

 August
 2 – Boyd Raeburn, American bandleader and bass saxophonist (heart attack) (born 1913).
 17 – Rolf Billberg, Swedish alto saxophonist (born 1930).

 September
 2 – Darnell Howard, American clarinetist and violinist (born 1895).
 28 – Lucky Millinder, African-American bandleader (born 1910).

 October
 3 – Dave Lambert, American lyricist and singer (born 1917).
 7 – Smiley Lewis, American singer and guitarist (born 1913).
 10 – Colette Bonheur, Canadian singer (born 1927).
 15 – Lee Blair, American banjoist and guitarist (born 1903).
 29 – Wellman Braud, American upright bassist (born 1891).

 November
 8 – Shorty Baker, American trumpeter (born 1914).

 December
 17 – Sylvia Telles, Brazilian samba and bossa nova singer (born 1934).

 Unknown date
 Nikele Moyake, South African tenor saxophonist, The Blue Notes (born 1933).

Births

 January
 10 – Kristin Sevaldsen, Norwegian saxophonist.
 12 – Ingrid Jensen, Canadian trumpeter.
 28 – Julian Argüelles, English saxophonist.

 February
 2 – Greg Gisbert, American trumpeter and flugelhornist.
 6
 Larry Grenadier, American upright bassist.
 Michael Mondesir, English bass guitarist and composer.
 7 – Henrik Andersen, Danish guitarist, singer-songwriter, multi-instrumentalist, and vocal percussionist.
 21 – Margareta Bengtson, Swedish soprano singer, The Real Group.

 March
 5 – Ann Farholt, Danish singer.
 14 – Raul Midón, American singer-songwriter and guitarist.
 22 – Jan Lundgren, Swedish pianist and composer.
 25 – Jeff Healey, Canadian singer and guitarist (died 2008).

 April
 2 – Michael Cain, American pianist and composer.
 12
 Nils-Olav Johansen, Norwegian guitarist.
 Rigmor Gustafsson, Swedish singer.
 15 – Warren Hill, Canadian alto saxaphonist.
 16 – Jarle Vespestad, Norwegian drummer.
 22 – Nina Shatskaya, Russian singer and actress.
 25 – Karen Mantler, American singer, composer, piano, organ, and chromatic harmonica player.

 May
 11 – Julian Joseph, British pianist, bandleader, composer, arranger, and broadcaster.
 13 – Julian Siegel, British saxophonist, clarinetist, composer, and arranger.
 20 – Sheryl Bailey, American guitarist and educator
 28 – Theo Bleckmann, German vocalist and composer.

 June
 8 – John Rae, Scottish drummer, composer, and band leader.
 19 – Silje Nergaard, Norwegian singer.

 July
 12 – Luciana Souza, Brazilian singer and composer.

 August
 5 – Roberto Tola, Italian guitarist and composer.
 6 – Regina Carter, American violinist.
 7 – Torstein Ellingsen, Norwegian drummer.
 11 – Donny McCaslin, American saxophonist.
 30 – John Gunther, American saxophonist.

 September
 4 – Biréli Lagrène, French guitarist.
 17 – Makiko Hirabayashi, Japanese pianist.

 October
 1 – Siri Gellein, Norwegian singer.
 6 – Mark Whitfield, American guitarist.
 12 – Harry Allen, American tenor saxophonist.
 15 – Bill Charlap, American pianist.
 18 – Bill Stewart, American drummer.
 27 – Nathalie Loriers, Belgian pianist and composer.

 November
 5 – Øystein B. Blix, Norwegian trombonist.
 12 – Anthony Joseph, British-Trinidadian poet, novelist, musician, and academic.
 25 – Jacky Terrasson, American pianist.

 Unknown date
 Carl Ludwig Hübsch, German tubist and composer.
 Hilmar Jensson, Icelandic guitarist and composer.
 Lars Møller, Danish saxophonist.
 Nils Davidsen, Danish bassist.
 Ricardo Garcia, Spanish guitarist and bandleader.
 Tony Kofi, British saxophonist and multi-instrumentalist.
 Toshimaru Nakamura, Japanese guitarist and electronica artist.
 Wessell Anderson, American alto and sopranino saxophonist.

See also

 1960s in jazz
 List of years in jazz
 1966 in music

References

Bibliography

External links 
 History Of Jazz Timeline: 1966 at All About Jazz

Jazz
Jazz by year